Frelinghuysen Township is a township in Warren County, New Jersey, United States. As of the 2020 United States census, the township's population was 2,199, a drop of 31 people since the 2010 census. As of the 2010 census, the township's population was 2,230, reflecting an increase of 147 (+7.1%) from the 2,083 counted in the 2000 Census, which had in turn increased by 304 (+17.1%) from the 1,779 counted in the 1990 census.

History
Frelinghuysen Township was incorporated from portions of Hardwick Township on March 7, 1848. According to the book Historical Sites of Warren County, the township was named for Theodorus Jacobus Frelinghuysen, a minister and theologian of the Dutch Reformed Church who came to New Jersey in 1720. Theodorus was the grandfather of Theodore Frelinghuysen, the noted statesman, educator and running mate of presidential candidate Henry Clay on the Whig Party ticket in the 1844 election, who is also credited as the inspiration for the township's name.

Geography
According to the United States Census Bureau, the township had a total area of 23.87 square miles (61.83 km2), including 23.62 square miles (61.18 km2) of land and 0.25 square miles (0.65 km2) of water (1.04%).

Johnsonburg (with a 2010 Census population of 101) and Marksboro (population of 82 in 2010) are unincorporated communities and census-designated places (CDPs) located within the township. Other unincorporated communities, localities and place names located partially or completely within the township include Ebenezer, Glovers Pond, Kerrs Corners, Shiloh, Southtown and Yellow Frame.

Frelinghuysen Township borders the municipalities of Allamuchy Township, Blairstown, Hardwick Township, Hope Township and Independence Township in Warren County; and Fredon Township, Green Township and Stillwater Township in Sussex County.

Demographics

The township's economic data (as is all of Warren County) is calculated by the US Census Bureau as part of the Allentown-Bethlehem-Easton, PA-NJ Metropolitan Statistical Area.

Census 2010

The Census Bureau's 2006–2010 American Community Survey showed that (in 2010 inflation-adjusted dollars) median household income was $94,688 (with a margin of error of +/− $10,942) and the median family income was $104,712 (+/− $8,336). Males had a median income of $81,667 (+/− $4,051) versus $53,857 (+/− $2,542) for females. The per capita income for the borough was $39,316 (+/− $3,207). About 2.2% of families and 5.1% of the population were below the poverty line, including 6.7% of those under age 18 and 3.8% of those age 65 or over.

Census 2000
As of the 2000 U.S. census, there were 2,083 people, 722 households, and 578 families residing in the township. The population density was 88.9 people per square mile (34.3/km2). There were 755 housing units at an average density of 32.2 per square mile (12.4/km2). The racial makeup of the township was 97.79% White, 0.34% African American, 0.05% Native American, 0.38% Asian, 0.19% Pacific Islander, 0.48% from other races, and 0.77% from two or more races. Hispanic or Latino of any race were 2.64% of the population.

There were 722 households, out of which 37.5% had children under the age of 18 living with them, 71.5% were married couples living together, 5.7% had a female householder with no husband present, and 19.9% were non-families. 14.5% of all households were made up of individuals, and 4.7% had someone living alone who was 65 years of age or older. The average household size was 2.81 and the average family size was 3.13.

In the township the population was spread out, with 26.1% under the age of 18, 4.8% from 18 to 24, 28.4% from 25 to 44, 29.7% from 45 to 64, and 11.0% who were 65 years of age or older. The median age was 40 years. For every 100 females, there were 97.4 males. For every 100 females age 18 and over, there were 94.0 males.

The median income for a household in the township was $72,434, and the median income for a family was $78,464. Males had a median income of $56,818 versus $36,827 for females. The per capita income for the township was $28,792. About 1.1% of families and 2.3% of the population were below the poverty line, including 0.6% of those under age 18 and 1.5% of those age 65 or over.

Government

Local government 
Frelinghuysen Township is governed under the Township form of New Jersey municipal government, one of 141 municipalities (of the 564) statewide that use this form, the second-most commonly used form of government in the state. The Township Committee is comprised of five members, who are elected directly by the voters at-large in partisan elections to serve three-year terms of office on a staggered basis, with either one or two seats coming up for election each year as part of the November general election in a three-year cycle. The committee has an organizational meeting each January to appoint a Mayor and Deputy Mayor from among its members. These officers serve for one year, until the next organizational meeting.

, members of the Frelinghuysen Township Committee are Mayor Keith C. Ramos (R, term on committee and as mayor ends December 31, 2022), Deputy Mayor Christopher Stracco (R, term on committee ends 2024; term as deputy mayor ends 2022), David C. Boynton (R, 2023), Todd McPeek (R, 2024) and Robert Stock (R, 2022; appointed to serve an unexpired term).

In January 2022, Robert Stack was sworn in to fill the seat expiring in December 2022 that had been held by Frank D. Desiderio Jr. until his resignation the previous month.

Federal, state, and county representation 
Frelinghuysen Township is located in the 7th Congressional District and is part of New Jersey's 24th state legislative district. 

Prior to the 2011 reapportionment following the 2010 Census, Frelinghuysen Township had been in the 23rd state legislative district.

Politics
As of March 23, 2011, there were a total of 1,583 registered voters in Frelinghuysen Township, of which 248 (15.7% vs. 21.5% countywide) were registered as Democrats, 700 (44.2% vs. 35.3%) were registered as Republicans and 634 (40.1% vs. 43.1%) were registered as Unaffiliated. There was one voter registered to another party. Among the township's 2010 Census population, 71.0% (vs. 62.3% in Warren County) were registered to vote, including 90.6% of those ages 18 and over (vs. 81.5% countywide).

In the 2012 presidential election, Republican Mitt Romney received 756 votes (65.3% vs. 56.0% countywide), ahead of Democrat Barack Obama with 368 votes (31.8% vs. 40.8%) and other candidates with 22 votes (1.9% vs. 1.7%), among the 1,157 ballots cast by the township's 1,582 registered voters, for a turnout of 73.1% (vs. 66.7% in Warren County). In the 2008 presidential election, Republican John McCain received 802 votes (64.4% vs. 55.2% countywide), ahead of Democrat Barack Obama with 405 votes (32.5% vs. 41.4%) and other candidates with 19 votes (1.5% vs. 1.6%), among the 1,246 ballots cast by the township's 1,577 registered voters, for a turnout of 79.0% (vs. 73.4% in Warren County). In the 2004 presidential election, Republican George W. Bush received 801 votes (66.3% vs. 61.0% countywide), ahead of Democrat John Kerry with 384 votes (31.8% vs. 37.2%) and other candidates with 20 votes (1.7% vs. 1.3%), among the 1,209 ballots cast by the township's 1,491 registered voters, for a turnout of 81.1% (vs. 76.3% in the whole county).

In the 2013 gubernatorial election, Republican Chris Christie received 75.7% of the vote (535 cast), ahead of Democrat Barbara Buono with 21.1% (149 votes), and other candidates with 3.3% (23 votes), among the 720 ballots cast by the township's 1,591 registered voters (13 ballots were spoiled), for a turnout of 45.3%. In the 2009 gubernatorial election, Republican Chris Christie received 623 votes (64.5% vs. 61.3% countywide), ahead of Democrat Jon Corzine with 219 votes (22.7% vs. 25.7%), Independent Chris Daggett with 95 votes (9.8% vs. 9.8%) and other candidates with 15 votes (1.6% vs. 1.5%), among the 966 ballots cast by the township's 1,560 registered voters, yielding a 61.9% turnout (vs. 49.6% in the county).

Education 
The Frelinghuysen Township School District serves children in public school in pre-kindergarten through sixth grade at Frelinghuysen Elementary School. As of the 2018–19 school year, the district, comprised of one school, had an enrollment of 148 students and 10.7 classroom teachers (on an FTE basis), for a student–teacher ratio of 13.9:1. In the 2016–2017 school year, Frelinghuysen had the 28th smallest enrollment of any school district in the state, with 150 students.

Students in seventh through twelfth grades for public school attend the North Warren Regional High School, a public secondary high school that also serves students from the townships of Blairstown (site of the school), Hardwick and Knowlton. As of the 2018–19 school year, the high school had an enrollment of 799 students and 77.6 classroom teachers (on an FTE basis), for a student–teacher ratio of 10.3:1.

Students from the township and from all of Warren County are eligible to attend Ridge and Valley Charter School in the township (for grades K–8, with Frelinghuysen residents among those receiving admissions preference) or Warren County Technical School in Washington borough (for 9–12), with special education services provided by local districts supplemented throughout the county by the Warren County Special Services School District in Oxford Township (for PreK–12).

Transportation

Interstate 80 (the Bergen-Passaic Expressway) traverses though the southern part of Frelinghuysen, but does not have any interchanges within the township; the closest exits are in both neighboring Allamuchy and Hope Townships. Route 94 runs through in the northern part of the township. CR 519 is the main county road that passes through roughly from the southwest to the northeast.

Notable people

People who were born in, residents of, or otherwise closely associated with Frelinghuysen Township include:

 Bennett Bean (born 1941), ceramic artist
 Cathy Bao Bean (born 1942), writer, educator and author of The Chopsticks-Fork Principle: A Memoir and Manual
 Isaac Wildrick (1803–1892), former U.S. Member of Congress

References

External links

Frelinghuysen Township website

 
1848 establishments in New Jersey
Populated places established in 1848
Township form of New Jersey government
Townships in Warren County, New Jersey